Lalvand (also Romanized as Lālvand) is a village in Rumeshkhan Rural District, Central District, Rumeshkhan County, Lorestan Province, Iran. It lies between the town of Chaqabol to the north-west, and the village of Rashnudeh to the southeast. At the 2006 census, its population was 852, in 177 families.

References 

Populated places in Rumeshkhan County